Keith Jerome Jackson, Jr. (born February 25, 1985) is a former American football defensive tackle. He was originally drafted by the St. Louis Rams in the seventh round of the 2007 NFL Draft. He played college football at Arkansas. He is the son of former NFL Pro Bowl tight end Keith Jackson.

College career
For the Arkansas Razorbacks, Jackson played in 44 games with 26 starts and posted 191 tackles (109 solo) with 7.0 sacks, 18.5 tackles for loss and 23 quarterback hurries, two career interceptions, including one returned for a touchdown. Jackson repeated his All-SEC designation in 2006 and started all 14 games at right defensive tackle and totaled career-high 79 tackles and Posted two interceptions, including one returned 69 yards for a touchdown. In 2005 Jackson started all 11 games, and posted an All-SEC season as a junior. He was named Second-team All-SEC by The Associated Press after he racked up 74 tackles, including 44 solo stops, including 6.5 TFL and six quarterback hurries. He also netted 2.5 sacks. In 2004, he saw action at defensive tackle in all 11 games during his sophomore season. He made his first career start at defensive tackle in the Hogs’ 49-20 win over Louisiana-Monroe. He tallied 26 tackles, including 4.5 tackles for loss  and two sacks. He made at least one stop in 10 of 11 games. In 2003, he was initially targeted for a  redshirt season, he was called into action in the fourth game of the season on the Hogs’ defensive front. He earned 12 tackles, a forced fumble and a fumble recovery in his eight games.

Jackson was a member of the Associated Press Arkansas Super Team as a senior. As a junior nose guard, he made 76 tackles with 50 unassisted stops while recording 4.5 sacks and three fumble recoveries. As a junior fullback he rushed for 880 yards and 13 touchdowns. As a senior, he had 80 tackles (eight for loss) and eight sacks.  He was a member of the PrepStar All-Region VI Team.

Professional career

Pre-draft

St. Louis Rams
Jackson was originally drafted by the St. Louis Rams in the seventh round of the 2007 NFL Draft. July 9, 2007, he signed a three-year contract with the Rams. He was cut on September 7, 2007, and signed to the Rams practice squad. On September 19, 2007, Jackson was released from the Rams practice squad and on November 20, 2007, the San Diego Chargers signed him to their practice squad.

San Diego Chargers
Jackson was re-signed by the Chargers on January 29, 2008. He was cut from the team on August 30, 2008.

Recent Events
On June 5, 2009, Jackson was arrested in Little Rock on drug charges.

Notes and references

External links
Arkansas Razorbacks bio

1985 births
Living people
Sportspeople from Little Rock, Arkansas
American football defensive tackles
Arkansas Razorbacks football players
St. Louis Rams players
San Diego Chargers players